Charles the Younger or Charles of Ingelheim (c. 772 – 4 December 811) was a member of the Carolingian dynasty, the second son of Charlemagne and the first by his second wife, Hildegard of Swabia and brother of Louis the Pious and Pepin Carloman.  When Charlemagne divided his empire among his sons, his son Charles was designated King of the Franks.

Life 
His eldest half-brother, Pippin the Hunchback, had been sent to the monastery of Prüm in 792 after having been involved in a rebellion against their father, Charlemagne. Of his younger brothers, Carloman (renamed Pippin) and Louis the Pious, were appointed sub-kings of Italy and Aquitaine.

Charles was mostly preoccupied with the Bretons, whose border he shared and who rebelled on at least two occasions and were easily put down, but he was also sent against the Saxons on multiple occasions. Charles' father outlived him, however, and the entire kingdom thus went to his younger brother Louis the Pious, Pippin also having died.

Around 789, it was suggested by Charlemagne that Charles the Younger should be married to Offa's daughter Ælfflæd. Offa insisted that the marriage could only go ahead if Charlemagne's daughter Bertha was married to Offa's son Ecgfrith. Charlemagne took offence, broke off contact, and closed his ports to English traders. Eventually, normal relations were reestablished and the ports were reopened. Just a few years later, in 796, Charlemagne and Offa concluded the first commercial treaty known in English history.

His father associated Charles in the government of Francia and Saxony in 790, and installed him as ruler of the ducatus Cenomannicus (corresponding to the later Duchy of Maine) with the title of king. Charles was crowned King of the Franks at Rome 25 December, 800, the same day his father was crowned Emperor.

He killed Sorbian duke Miliduch and Slavic Knez, Nussito (Nessyta) near modern-day Weißenfels in a Frankish campaign in 806.

On 4 December 811, in Bavaria, Charles had a stroke and died. He left no children. In the Matter of France, Charles is fictionalized as Charlot.

References

Monarchs of the Carolingian Empire
Frankish warriors
Children of Charlemagne
770s births
811 deaths
Dukes of Maine
9th-century Frankish monarchs
8th-century Frankish nobility
Carolingian dynasty
Sons of emperors